White Cloud Peak 3, also known as WCP 3, at  above sea level is an unofficially named peak in the White Cloud Mountains of Idaho. The peak is located in Sawtooth National Recreation Area in Custer County  from White Cloud Peak 5, its line parent. Swimm Lake is southwest of the peak.

References 

Mountains of Custer County, Idaho
Mountains of Idaho
Sawtooth National Forest